Wyggeston and Queen Elizabeth I College is a sixth form college, located in Leicester, England. The college is led by Paul Wilson who was appointed the eighth principal in March 2018. The college merged with the nearby Regent College in 2018 to form an institution with approximately 3,750 full-time 16–18-year-old students and 140 teaching staff. More than 40 subjects are offered at A Level.

The college was awarded Learning and Skills Beacon Status in April 2003.

History

The college, which has over 3,750 students, was founded in 1976 following a (comprehensive) re-organisation of secondary education in the city. Many other parts of rural Leicestershire had gone comprehensive in 1968.

The college now occupies a site adjoining Victoria Park and the University of Leicester that was previously occupied by Wyggeston Grammar School for Boys (also known as Wyggeston Boys' School).

The school takes the Wyggeston name from the former school and from Wyggeston Grammar School for Girls, which both closed in the 1970s.

In 1976 the site of the former girls’ school became Wyggeston Collegiate Sixth Form College, known as Regent College between 1996 and 2018, when it merged with Wyggeston and Queen Elizabeth I College.

Principals
Dr G A Thompson – 1978-1994 (also head of the former grammar school from 1968)
Dr Robert Wilkinson – 1994-2002
Ian Wilson – 2002–2012
Sandra Hamilton-Fox - 2012–2016
Paul Wilson – 2018–present

Curriculum
Courses including AS, A2 and GCSEs are provided at the College. The International Baccalaureate (IB) Diploma was introduced in September 2006 with 33 students opting for this alternative. The last cohort of the IB completed the course in 2012, and the programme is no longer offered.

Academic performance
In 2006 the A Level pass rate was 98 per cent with 45 per cent at grades A and B. About 90% of students progress to higher education, mostly in the Midlands region.

Notable former students

 H.E. Atkins Leading British chess player from 1905 to 1925.
 Bali Rai, novelist

References

External links
 College web site
 EduBase
 Wyggeston Girls Grammar final day as suffragettes 1967

Educational institutions established in 1976
Sixth form colleges in Leicestershire
Learning and Skills Beacons
Education in Leicester
1976 establishments in England